Pocillopora capitata is a colonial species of stony coral in the family Pocilloporidae.

References

Pocilloporidae
Cnidarians of the Pacific Ocean
Taxa named by Addison Emery Verrill
Corals described in 1864